The Federal Equestrian Park (Parc Équestre Fédéral in French) is an equestrian center situated next to Lamotte-Beuvron, in the Loir-et-Cher department in France. It hosts a number of international events, including the Generali Open de France.

References

Equestrian venues